Royal Crypt may refer to:

 Royal Crypt (Belgium), burial place of Belgian monarchs
 Royal Crypt of Superga, burial place of Italian monarchs

See also
 Burial sites of European monarchs and consorts